Old Khmer is the oldest attested stage of the Khmer language, an Austroasiatic language historically and presently spoken across Cambodia, Southern Vietnam, and parts of Thailand and Laos. It is recorded in inscriptions dating from the early 7th century until the first few decades of the 15th century. Such inscriptions, spanning nearly a millennium and numbering well over a thousand, present one of the most extensive sources of documentation in Southeast Asia.

Old Khmer was written in an early variant of the Khmer script derived from Pallava, a southern variant of Brahmi, and in turn became the basis of the scripts used for Thai and Lao. Along with Brahmi and Indian influence on Cambodia, Old Khmer saw an influx of Sanskrit loanwords in the domains of religion, philosophy, and to a lesser extent, in politics. Despite this, Old Khmer retained a prototypical Austroasiatic typology in phonology, syntax, and morphology, being sesquisyllabic, analytic, having a rich system of derivational affixes.

The language is customarily divided into Pre-Angkorian (611-802) and Angkorian (802-1431) stages based on both the date and the distribution of surviving inscriptions, with Pre-Angkorian inscriptions concentrated in the southern regions of Cambodia. After the abandonment of the sites of Angkor as the political centre of the Khmer-speaking polity, the practice of epigraphy decreased in the following centuries but did not disappear, persisting until the 20th century. However, inscriptions after the 15th century are customarily held to reflect the Middle Khmer stage of the language.

Terminology 
As an endogenous term referring to the people and language, ក្មេរ៑ (/kmeː/) is attested in inscriptional lists specifying the ethnolinguistic affiliation of personnels attached to temples alongside terms for other ethnic groups, e.g. Mon, Chong, Bru. Its provenance is unknown, possibly deriving from mer "chief", "principal" or "mother".

Attestation and History 
Old Khmer entered into the historical period rather abruptly in 611, with all earlier inscriptions in present-day Cambodia and the Mekong Delta being written in Sanskrit. Even the earliest inscriptions, however, show a high degree of uniformity in orthography, suggesting a period of development prior to the first epigraphic attestation. Their contents, like later inscriptions, tend to concern legal matters such as land and property, donations to temples, and genealogies and lineages, suggesting a society already deeply entrenched in lower Cambodia. In terms of geography, the earliest inscriptions are concentrated in the southern parts of Cambodia and subsequent inscriptions show a south-to-north dispersal.

Due to the primarily legalistic nature of the inscriptions, the surviving corpus of Old Khmer represents only a partial picture of the language. Nonetheless, they provide important documentary evidence of the language's phonology, morphology, and syntax as well as clues about the natural and sociopolitical environments surrounding its speakers.

Influences 
Like other classical languages of Southeast Asia, Old Khmer was subject to heavy Sanskrit influence. This is especially evident in religious and philosophical concepts and in calendrical numerology, for which Khmer had no equivalents, but sometimes the choice of Sanskrit words over native equivalents were stylistic rather than necessary.

Phonology 
There is some ambiguity in sound and grapheme correspondence in Old Khmer. In particular, plain plosives /p/ and /t/ are not distinguished from implosive /ɓ/ and /ɗ/, both sets being represented by p and t respectively. Vowels, in particular, show a higher degree of ambiguity. Diphthongs /iːə/ and /uːə/ are represented by digraphs ya and va respectively.

Morphosyntax

Orthography 
Pre-Angkorian (611-802) and Angkorian (802-1431) show minor differences in orthography, reflecting perhaps dialectal differences between the south and the north of the country or perhaps just differences in convention. These differences include representations of certain vowels and consonants.

See also 
  Khmer inscriptions
 Middle Khmer

References 

Languages attested from the 7th century
Khmer language